Myomegalin, also known as phosphodiesterase 4D-interacting protein or cardiomyopathy-associated protein 2, is a protein that in humans is encoded by the PDE4DIP gene. It has roles in the formation of microtubules from the centrosome. Its name derives from the fact that it is highly expressed in units of tubular myofibrils known as sarcomeres and is a large protein, at 2,324 amino acids. It was first characterised in 2000.

Structure and function 
Myomegalin is mostly composed of alpha-helix and coiled-coil structures and has domains shared with microtubule-associated proteins. It has several isoforms, at least two of which have been characterised, CM-MMG and EB-MMG.

Myomegalin is necessary for the sufficient growth of microtubules from the centrosomes. The CM-MMG isoform binds at the centrosome with γ-tubulin in an AKAP9-dependent manner and on the near side of the Golgi apparatus, while the EB-MMG isoform binds with MAPRE1 at the Golgi apparatus and increases MAPRE1's effects on microtubule growth.

Myomegalin, specifically the CM-MMG isoform, is a paralogue of CDK5RAP2. Myomegalin depletion in cells does not lead to decreases in γ-tubulin or CDK5RAP2, unlike CDK5RAP2 depletion, and does not appear to affect mitosis through various spindle anchoring and orientation defects, unlike CDK5RAP2. This indicates that CDK5RAP2 can somewhat serve to compensate for the absence of myomegalin. However, myomegalin-depleted cells have slower migration, since microtubules are crucial for cell motility.

Orthologues of myomegalin are seen in vertebrates as far back as bony fish, around 450 million years ago. In mammals, around 200 million years ago, myomegalin gained an Olduvai domain. Olduvai domains have so far only elsewhere been found in NBPF genes in placental mammals, many of which are adjacent to myomegalin on chromosome 1, so it is believed that these genes originated from a duplication of myomegalin. Increased NPBF Olduvai domain duplications in humans have been implicated in human brain size evolution.

Interactions 

Myomegalin (PDE4DIP) has been shown to interact with PDE4D.

History 
The protein was discovered in 2000 and was so named because it was highly expressed in rat heart muscle sarcomeres (units of tubular myofibrils) and is a large protein, at 2,324 amino acids.

See also 

1q21.1 deletion syndrome
1q21.1 duplication syndrome

References

Further reading 

 
 
 
 
 

Human proteins